Rajamangala University of Technology Thanyaburi Satadium is a multi-purpose stadium in Pathum Thani Province, Thailand.  It is currently used mostly for football matches and is the home stadium of Rangsit F.C.  The stadium holds ? people.

Multi-purpose stadiums in Thailand
Buildings and structures in Pathum Thani province
Sport in Pathum Thani province